In measure theory, a branch of mathematics, a continuity set of a measure μ is any Borel set B such that 
 

where  is the (topological) boundary of B.  For signed measures, one asks that
 

The class of all continuity sets for given measure μ forms a ring.

Similarly, for a random variable X, a set B is called continuity set if

Continuity set of a function

The continuity set C(f) of a function f is the set of points where f is continuous.

References 

Measure theory